Farhan Farhan (born 24 October 1996) is a Bahraini swimmer. He competed in the men's 50 metre freestyle event at the 2016 Summer Olympics. After placing 58th in the heats, he did not qualify for the semifinals. He was the flag bearer for Bahrain during the Parade of Nations.

References

External links
 

1996 births
Living people
Bahraini male freestyle swimmers
Olympic swimmers of Bahrain
Swimmers at the 2016 Summer Olympics
Place of birth missing (living people)